Boleophthalmus  is a genus of mudskippers native to the Indian Ocean and the western Pacific Ocean.

Species
There are currently six recognized species in this genus:
 B. birdsongi Murdy, 1989 (Birdsong's mudskipper)
 B. boddarti (Pallas, 1770) (Boddart's goggle-eyed goby)
 B. caeruleomaculatus McCulloch & Waite, 1918 (Bluespotted mudskipper)
 B. dussumieri Valenciennes, 1837
 B. pectinirostris (Linnaeus, 1758) (Great blue spotted mudskipper)
 B. poti Polgar, Jaafar & Konstantinidis, 2013

References

Bibliography

 Eschmeyer, William N. 1990. Genera of Recent Fishes. California Academy of Sciences. San Francisco. iii + 697. .
 Eschmeyer, William N. (ed.) 1998. Catalog of Fishes. Special Publication of the Center for Biodiversity Research and Information, #1, vol. 1–3. California Academy of Sciences. San Francisco. 2905. .
 Helfman, G., B. Collette & D. Facey: The diversity of fishes. Blackwell Science, Malden, MA, 1997.
 Moyle, P. & J. Cech.: Fishes: An Introduction to Ichthyology, 4a. edició, Upper Saddle River, NJ: Prentice-Hall. Any 2000.
 Nelson, J.S. 2006: Fishes of the world. Quarta edició. John Wiley & Sons, Inc. Hoboken, NJ. 601 p. . 
 Wheeler, A. 1985. The World Encyclopedia of Fishes, 2nd edition, London: Macdonald.

External links

 NCBI
 ITIS
 World Register of Marine Species
 Encyclopedia of Life
 ZipCodeZoo
 uBio
 Hong Kong Wetland Park

 
Mudskippers
Marine fish genera
Oxudercinae
Taxa named by Achille Valenciennes